This list consists of the internationally well-known personalities that speak Arabic out of the more than 300 million Arabic-speakers worldwide.

Turkey 
Ahmet Davutoglu, former Prime Minister of Turkey from 2014 to 2016.

Afghanistan 
 Burhanuddin Rabbani, former President of Afghanistan
 Younis Qanooni

Australia 
 Jacques Nasser, former CEO of Ford Motor Company

France 
 Arnaud Montebourg, politician, former Minister of the Economy, and Socialist Party candidate for the presidential nomination
 Myriam El Khomri, former Minister of Labor from 2015 to 2017

Russia 
 Vitaly Naumkin, Director of the Center for Arab Studies at the Institute of Oriental Studies, Russian Academy of Sciences.

United States 
 Faisal Abdul Rauf, Imam
 As'ad AbuKhalil, Professor of political science at California State University, Stanislaus
 Fouad Ajami: Professor of Middle Eastern studies
 Nihad Awad: the executive director of the Council on American-Islamic Relations
 Rima Fakih: Miss USA 2010
 Fawaz Gerges, Professor at the London School of Economics and Political Science
 Hala Gorani: CNN presenter
 Octavia Nasr: a Mideast affairs expert and former CNN editor of Mideast affairs
 Nassim Nicholas Taleb, Professor of Risk Engineering at Polytechnic Institute of New York University, Research Scholar at Said Business School, Oxford University and author of The Black Swan
 DJ Khaled, rapper, music producer, and social media personality
 Ralph Nader, independent politician and activist, helped overhaul automobile safety laws

References 

Arabic language
Lists of people by language